The 1950 Iowa Hawkeyes football team represented the University of Iowa in the 1950 Big Nine Conference football season. Led by first-year head coach Leonard Raffensperger, the Hawkeyes compiled an overall record of 3–5–1 with a mark of 2–4 in conference play, placing sixth in the Big Ten. The team played home games at Iowa Stadium in Iowa City, Iowa.

Schedule

References

Iowa
Iowa Hawkeyes football seasons
Iowa Hawkeyes football